Mali is a country in Western Africa.

Mali may also refer to:

Places
Mali Empire, a Mandinka nation that existed from c. 1247 to c. 1600
Mali Federation, a former country in Western Africa 
Mali, Guinea, a town in Guinea
Mali Prefecture, a prefecture in Guinea
Mali, Ardabil, a town in Iran
Mali River, a river in Myanmar
Mali Kyun (Tavoy Island)，an sea island in Myanmar. 
Mali, Nepal
Alor Island Airport, an airport in Indonesia, also known as Mali Airport
Museo de Arte de Lima, an art museum in Peru

People 
Anais Mali (born 1991), French model.
Mali (cartoonist), Indian cartoonist
Mali (singer), Indian singer
Mali Wu (born 1957), Taiwanese installation artist
T. R. Mahalingam (flautist) or Mali

Other uses
Mali (album), a 2004 album by Brenda Fassie
Mali (dog), a military working dog awarded the 2017 Dickin Medal for bravery
Mali (film), a 2018 Croatian film
Mali (GPU), graphics hardware and software manufactured by ARM Holdings
Mali (TV series), a 2011–2015 Kenyan soap opera
Mali caste, a caste of gardeners and vegetable growers in Nepal and India
Litsea garciae, a tree native to Southeast Asia locally called Mali
Mali, a colloquial term for a Somali person

See also
Ma Li (disambiguation)
Mallee (disambiguation)
Malli (disambiguation)
Molly (disambiguation)
Montenegro or Mali i Zi in Albanian